John M. Hansford (died January 1844) was a justice of the Supreme Court of the Republic of Texas from 1840 to 1842.

References

Justices of the Texas Supreme Court
1844 deaths
Date of birth unknown